The Medical Post is a semimonthly magazine, published 21 times a year, aimed at Canadian physicians. In 2007, it reported a circulation of 47,000. It was founded in 1965.

References

External links

The Medical Post Media Kit 2007

Healthcare in Canada
Publications established in 1965